Thomas West, 3rd Baron De La Warr (9 July 1577 – 7 June 1618), was an English merchant and politician, for whom the bay, the river, and, consequently, a Native American people and U.S. state, all later called "Delaware", were named. He was a member of the House of Lords from the death of his father in 1602 until his own death in 1618.

There have been two creations of Baron De La Warr, and West came from the second. He was the son of Thomas West, 2nd Baron De La Warr, of Wherwell Abbey in Hampshire and Anne Knollys, daughter of Catherine Carey, Lady Knollys; making him a great-grandson of Mary Boleyn. He was born at Wherwell, Hampshire, England, and died at sea while travelling from England to the Colony of Virginia. Counting from the original creation of the title, West would be the 12th Baron.

Early and family life
As the eldest son of the 2nd Baron De La Warr, Thomas West received his education at Queen's College, Oxford. He served in the English army under Robert Devereux, 2nd Earl of Essex, and, in 1601, was charged with supporting Essex's ill-fated insurrection against Queen Elizabeth I, but acquitted of those charges. He succeeded his father as Baron De La Warr in 1602. It was said that he became a member of the Privy Council, but this has been disproved. In 1645 Dame Cicly petitioned the House of Lords to continue the pension that King James had granted her husband.

Career
Lord De La Warr was the largest investor in the London Company, which received two charters to settle colonists in the New World, and furnished and sent several vessels to accomplish that aim. He was appointed governor-for-life and captain-general of the Colony of Virginia, to replace the governing council of the colony under the presidency of Captain John Smith. Subsequently, in November 1609, the Powhatan tribe of Native Americans killed John Ratcliffe, the Jamestown Colony's Council President, and attacked the colony in what became the First Anglo-Powhatan War. As part of England's response, De La Warr recruited and equipped a contingent of 150 men and outfitted three ships at his own expense, and sailed from England in March 1610.

Lord De La Warr contracted malaria or scurvy in 1611. He left the colony on a ship captained by Sir Samuel Argall headed to the West Indies to recover but was blown off course by a storm and forced to return to England.

Later that year, De La Warr published a book titled The Relation of the Right Honourable the Lord De-La-Warre, Lord Governour and Captaine Generall of the Colonie, planted in Virginea. Although attributed to De La Warr, the book was actually written by company employee Samuel Calvert.

In the Autumn of 1616, Baron De La Warr and his wife Cecilia Shirley West, introduced John Rolfe and his wife, Pocahontas, into English society. The visitors from Virginia were in London to raise funds for the Virginia Company of London and to encourage colonization of Virginia. De La Warr remained the nominal governor, and after receiving complaints from the Virginia settlers about Argall's tyranny in governing them on his behalf, he set sail for Virginia again in 1618 aboard the Neptune to investigate those charges. He died at sea on 7 June and it is believed that he was poisoned.

It was thought for many years that Lord De La Warr had been buried in the Azores or at sea. By 2006, researchers had concluded that his body was brought to Jamestown for burial. In October 2017, archaeologists excavated remains from underneath one of the churches at Historic Jamestowne, but it is not yet known if De La Warr's is one of those.

Lord De La Warr's brother, John West, later became governor of Virginia, and married Anne Percy, daughter of George Percy.

Family
On 25 November 1596, De La Warr married Cecily Shirley (died c. 1662), the daughter of Sir Thomas Shirley of Wiston, Sussex, and his wife Anne, daughter of Sir Thomas Kempe. They had children:
Cecily or Cecilia (died February 1638), who married firstly Sir Francis Bindlosse and secondly after 1629 John Byron, 1st Baron Byron. She was buried at Hucknall-Torkard in Nottinghamshire.
Lucy, who married Sir Robert Byron (d. after 1643), Governor of Liverpool and a Colonel in the service of the Royalist Infantry Forces who fought in the English Civil War.
Robert, who married Elizabeth Coch.
 Henry (1603–1628), who succeeded his father as the 4th Baron De La Warr, married Isabella, daughter of Sir Thomas Edmondes, in March 1625. He died at the age of 24 and was succeeded by his son Charles West, 5th Baron De La Warr.

Notes

References

External links
Biography at Encyclopedia Virginia

Thomas West, 03 Baron De La Warr
Virginia colonial people
1577 births
1618 deaths
English emigrants
People of the Elizabethan era
Virginia Governor's Council members
People who died at sea
Burials in Virginia
History of Delaware
16th-century English nobility
17th-century English nobility
Barons De La Warr